Troy High School, also known as Troy Community Complex, was a public high school in Troy, Alabama. It was built in 1917.  It was designed by architect Frank Lockwood.  The school was replaced by Charles Henderson High School.  The building was demolished in 2010.  A public library has been built on the site.  It was listed on the U.S. National Register of Historic Places in 1984.

References

National Register of Historic Places in Pike County, Alabama
Schools in Pike County, Alabama
Defunct schools in Alabama
Demolished buildings and structures in Alabama